Senefelderopsis is a plant genus of the family Euphorbiaceae.
It is native to southern tropical America, and found in Colombia, Guyana and Venezuela.

The genus was circumscribed by Julian Alfred Steyermark in Bot. Mus. Leafl. vol.15 on page 45 in 1951.

The genus name of Senefelderopsis is in honour of Johann Alois Senefelder (1771–1834), who was a German actor and playwright who invented the printing technique of lithography in the 1790s.

Species
 Senefelderopsis chiribiquetensis 
 Senefelderopsis croizatii

References

Hippomaneae
Euphorbiaceae genera
Flora of northern South America
Flora of Colombia